The 2001–02 Kategoria e Dytë was the 55th season of a second-tier association football league in Albania.

Group A

Promotion playoff

Group A

Group B

Final 

 Besa was promoted to 2002–03 National Championship.

Group B

Championship final

References

 Calcio Mondiale Web
 RSSSF.org

Kategoria e Parë seasons
2
Alba